The brown-winged starling (Aplonis grandis) is a species of starling in the family Sturnidae. It is found in the Solomon Islands archipelago. Its natural habitat is subtropical or tropical moist lowland forests.

References

brown-winged starling
Endemic birds of the Solomon Islands
brown-winged starling
Taxonomy articles created by Polbot